František Filip (26 December 1930 – 9 January 2021) was a Czech film and television director.

Biography 
During his studies at the Film and TV School of the Academy of Performing Arts in Prague in the 1950s, he filmed his first documentary film. After graduation, he joined Czechoslovak Television in 1954, where he remained until his retirement. However; even after retirement he still continued to work in television. During the span of his career, he directed about 600 film and television programs of various genres for viewers of all ages. In 2017, he was awarded the Thalia Award.

Death 
Filip died from COVID-19 in Prague on 9 January 2021, at the age of 90, during the COVID-19 pandemic in the Czech Republic.

Filmography

Television series 
 1960 Jak šel Ferda do světa (puppet series for children)
 1962 Tři chlapi v chalupě
 1966 Eliška a její rod
 1968 Sňatky z rozumu
 1971 F. L. Věk
 1974 Byl jednou jeden dům
 1975 Chalupáři
 1982 Dobrá Voda
 1984 Rozpaky kuchaře Svatopluka
 1986 Zlá krev
 1988 Cirkus Humberto
 1990 Přísahám a slibuji
 1992 Náhrdelník
 2000 Pra pra pra

Musical works 
 1978 Polská krev
 1981 Prodaná nevěsta
 1983 Netopýr

Other television productions 
 1962 Kočár nejsvětější svátosti
 1967 Lucerna
 1971 Kat nepočká
 1975 Lístek do památníku
 1976 Podnájemníci
 1977 Ikarův pád
 1977 Paličova dcera
 1980 Nezralé maliny
 1980 Scapinova šibalství
 1980 Utopím si ho sám
 1983 Tažní práci
 1995 Den, kdy unesli papeže

Film 
 1964 Příběh dušičkový
 1966 Hrdina má strach
 1967 Utrpení mladého Boháčka
 1969 Odvážná slečna
 1993 Jedna kočka za druhou
 1999 Nebát se a nakrást

References

External links 

1930 births
2021 deaths
People from Písek
Czech film directors
Recipients of the Thalia Award
Deaths from the COVID-19 pandemic in the Czech Republic
Recipients of Medal of Merit (Czech Republic)